In Their Darkened Shrines is the third studio album by American death metal band Nile. It was released on August 20, 2002 through Relapse Records. It is the only album to feature Tony Laureano on drums. In addition to being Nile's longest studio album, the title track is the band's longest song ever made at over 18 minutes in length.

Songs
The lyrics to "In Their Darkened Shrines IV: Ruins" are borrowed from the H. P. Lovecraft short story, "The Nameless City". These lyrics are not actually spoken in the song, as it is an instrumental. Along with "In Their Darkened Shrines I: Hall of Saurian Entombment", the lyrics are supplementary to the theme of the instrumental.

The two main melodies of "Unas Slayer Of The Gods" are a tribute to "Gothic Stone/The Well of Souls" by Candlemass, from their doom metal album Nightfall.

Music videos were made for "Execration Text" and "Sarcophagus".

Track listing
All tracks written by Karl Sanders except where noted.

Personnel
Nile
 Karl Sanders – guitars, vocals, bass
 Dallas Toler-Wade – guitars, vocals, bass
 Tony Laureano – drums
Additional musicians
 Jon Vesano – additional vocals
 Mike Breazeale – additional vocals
Production
 Produced by Bob Moore
 Recorded & engineered by Bob Moore
 Mixed by Bob Moore & Nile
 Mastered by Scott Hull (Pig Destroyer)

References

2002 albums
Nile (band) albums
Relapse Records albums